Taron is a genus of sea snails, marine gastropod mollusks in the family Fasciolariidae, the spindle snails, the tulip snails and their allies.

Species
Species within the genus Taron include:

 Taron albocostus Ponder, 1968
 Taron dubius (Hutton, 1878)
 Taron mouatae Powell, 1940

References

External links
 Bruce A. Marshall, Molluscan and brachiopod taxa introduced by F. W. Hutton in The New Zealand journal of science; Journal of the Royal Society of New Zealand, Volume 25, Issue 4, 1995

Fasciolariidae